Love Byrd is a 1981 album by Donald Byrd and 125th Street, N.Y.C., produced by Isaac Hayes and released on the Elektra label.

Track listing

Side one

 "Love Has Come Around" (William Duckett) – 7:52 
 "Butterfly" (Andrew Stevens) – 6:05
 "I Feel Like Loving You Today" (Isaac Hayes) – 6:57

Side two
 "I Love Your Love" (Isaac Hayes, Aaron Mills, William Duckett, Andrew Stevens) – 6:59
 "I'll Always Love You" (Donald Byrd) – 5:13
 "Love for Sale" (Cole Porter) – 6:06
 "Falling" (Isaac Hayes) – 3:01

Personnel
 Donald Byrd – trumpet
 Isaac Hayes – piano, Fender Rhodes, vibraphone, percussion, synthesizer
 Ronnie Garrett – bass guitar
 William Duckett – electric guitar
 Albert Crawford Jr. – piano, Fender Rhodes, clavinet
 Eric Hines – drum kit
 Myra Walker – piano
 Rose Williams – vocalist
 Diane Williams – vocalist
 Pat Lewis – vocalist
 Diane Evans – vocalist

Production
 Joe Neil – engineer
 Bret Richardson – assistant engineer

References

1981 albums
Donald Byrd albums
Elektra Records albums
Albums produced by Isaac Hayes